Robert Foster (23 October 1880 – 13 May 1946) was a Jamaican cricketer. He played in one first-class match for the Jamaican cricket team in 1910/11.

See also
 List of Jamaican representative cricketers

References

External links
 

1880 births
1946 deaths
Jamaican cricketers
Jamaica cricketers
Cricketers from Kingston, Jamaica